Alexandre Kojève (28 April 1902 – 4 June 1968) was a Russian-born French philosopher and statesman whose philosophical seminars had an immense influence on 20th-century French philosophy, particularly via his integration of Hegelian concepts into twentieth-century continental philosophy. As a statesman in the French government, he was instrumental in the formation of the European Union.

Life
Kojève was born Aleksandr Vladimirovich Kozhevnikov in Russia to a wealthy and influential family. His uncle was the abstract artist Wassily Kandinsky, about whose work he would write an influential essay in 1936. He was educated at the University of Berlin and Heidelberg, Germany. In Heidelberg, he completed in 1926 his PhD thesis on the Russian religious philosopher Vladimir Soloviev's views on the union of God and man in Christ under the direction of Karl Jaspers. The title of his thesis was Die religiöse Philosophie Wladimir Solowjews (The Religious Philosophy of Vladimir Soloviev). 

Early influences included the philosopher Martin Heidegger and the historian of science Alexandre Koyré. Kojève spent most of his life in France and from 1933 to 1939 delivered in Paris a series of lectures on Georg Wilhelm Friedrich Hegel's work Phenomenology of Spirit. After World War II, Kojève worked in the French Ministry of Economic Affairs as one of the chief planners of the European Common Market.

Kojève studied and used Sanskrit, Chinese, Tibetan, Latin and Classical Greek. He was also fluent in French, German, Russian and English.

Kojève died in Brussels in 1968, shortly after giving a talk at the European Economic Community (now the European Union) on behalf of the French government.

Philosophy

Although not an orthodox Marxist, Kojève was known as an influential and idiosyncratic interpreter of Hegel, reading him through the lens of both Karl Marx and Martin Heidegger. The well-known end of history thesis advanced the idea that ideological history in a limited sense had ended with the French Revolution and the regime of Napoleon and that there was no longer a need for violent struggle to establish the "rational supremacy of the regime of rights and equal recognition". Kojève's end of history is different from Francis Fukuyama's later thesis of the same name in that it points as much to a socialist-capitalist synthesis as to a triumph of liberal capitalism. Mark Lilla notes that Kojève rejected the prevailing concept among European intellectuals of the 1930s that capitalism and democracy were failed artifacts of the Enlightenment that would be destroyed by either communism or fascism. In contrast, while initially somewhat more sympathetic to the Soviet Union than the United States, Kojève devoted much of his thought to protecting western European autonomy, particularly so France, from domination by either the Soviet Union or the United States. He believed that the capitalist United States represented right-Hegelianism while the state-socialist Soviet Union represented left-Hegelianism. Thus, victory by either side, he posited, would result in what Lilla describes as "a rationally organized bureaucracy without class distinctions".

Kojève's lectures on Hegel were collected, edited and published by Raymond Aron in 1947, and published in abridged form in English in the now classic Introduction to the Reading of Hegel: Lectures on the Phenomenology of Spirit. His interpretation of Hegel has been one of the most influential of the past century. His lectures were attended by a small but influential group of intellectuals including Raymond Queneau, Georges Bataille, Maurice Merleau-Ponty, André Breton, Jacques Lacan, Raymond Aron, Michel Leiris, Henry Corbin and Éric Weil. His interpretation of the master–slave dialectic was an important influence on Jacques Lacan's mirror stage theory. Other French thinkers who have acknowledged his influence on their thought include the post-structuralist philosophers Michel Foucault and Jacques Derrida.

Kojève's correspondence with Leo Strauss has been published along with Kojève's critique of Strauss's commentary on Xenophon's Hiero. In the 1950s, Kojève also met the rightist legal theorist Carl Schmitt, whose "Concept of the Political" he had implicitly criticized in his analysis of Hegel's text on "Lordship and Bondage" . Another close friend was the Jesuit Hegelian philosopher Gaston Fessard.

In addition to his lectures on the Phenomenology of Spirit, Kojève's other publications include a little noticed book on Immanuel Kant and articles on the relationship between Hegelian and Marxist thought and Christianity. His 1943 book Esquisse d'une phenomenologie du droit, published posthumously in 1981, elaborates a theory of justice that contrasts the aristocratic and bourgeois views of the right. Le Concept, le temps et le discours extrapolates on the Hegelian notion that wisdom only becomes possible in the fullness of time. Kojève's response to Strauss, who disputed this notion, can be found in Kojève's article "The Emperor Julian and his Art of Writing".

Kojève also challenged Strauss' interpretation of the classics in the voluminous Esquisse d'une histoire raisonnée de la pensée païenne which covers the pre-Socratic philosophers, Plato and Aristotle, as well as Neoplatonism. While the first volume of the previous work was still published during his life-time, most of his writings remained unpublished until recently. These are becoming the subject of increased scholarly attention. The books that have so far been published are the two remaining volumes of the Esquisse d'une histoire raisonnée de la pensée païenne (1972, 1973 [1952]), Outline of a Phenomenology of Right (1981 [1943]), L'idée du déterminisme dans la physique classique et dans la physique moderne (1990 [1932]), Le Concept, le Temps et Le Discours (1990[1952]), L'Athéisme (1998[1931]), The Notion of Authority (2004[1942]), and "Identité et Réalité dans le "Dictionnaire" de Pierre Bayle" (2010[1937]). Several of his shorter texts are also gathering greater attention and some are being published in book form as well.

Friendship with Leo Strauss 
Kojève had a close and lifelong friendship with Leo Strauss which began when they were philosophy students in Berlin. The two shared a deep philosophical respect for each other. Kojève would later write that he "never would have known [...] what philosophy is" without Strauss. In the 1930s, the two began a debate on the relation of philosophy to politics that would come to fruition with Kojève's response to Strauss' On Tyranny. Kojève, a senior statesman in the French government, argued that philosophers should have an active part in shaping political events. On the other hand, Strauss believed that philosophy and politics were fundamentally opposed and that philosophers should not have a substantial role in politics, noting the disastrous results of Plato in Syracuse. Philosophers should influence politics only to the extent that they can ensure that philosophical contemplation remains free from the seduction and coercion of power. In spite of this debate, Strauss and Kojève remained friendly. In fact, Strauss would send his best students to Paris to finish their education under Kojève's personal guidance. Among these were Allan Bloom, who endeavored to make Kojève's works available in English and published the first edition of Kojève's lectures in English, and Stanley Rosen.

Kojève and the Soviet Union

In 1999, Le Monde published an article reporting that a French intelligence document showed that Kojève had spied for the Soviets for over thirty years. 
In any case, Kojève's contribution to international French economic policy was more than substantial. Although Kojève often claimed to be a Stalinist, he largely regarded the Soviet Union with contempt, calling its social policies disastrous and its claims to be a truly classless state ludicrous. Kojève's cynicism towards traditional Marxism as an outmoded philosophy in industrially well-developed capitalist nations prompted him to go as far as idiosyncratically referring to capitalist Henry Ford as "the one great authentic Marxist of the twentieth century". He specifically and repeatedly called the Soviet Union the only country in which 19th-century capitalism still existed. His Stalinism was quite ironic, but he was serious about Stalinism to the extent that he regarded the utopia of the Soviet Union under Stalin and the willingness to purge unsupportive elements in the population as evidence of a desire to bring about the end of history and as a repetition of the Reign of Terror of the French Revolution.

Critics 
In a commentary on Francis Fukuyama's  The End of History and the Last Man, the traditionalist conservative thinker Roger Scruton calls Kojève "a life-hating Russian at heart, a self-declared Stalinist, and a civil servant who played a leading behind-the-scenes role in establishing both the General Agreement on Tariffs and Trade and the European Economic Community" and states his opinion that Kojève was "a dangerous psychopath".

Bibliography
 Alexander Koschewnikoff, Die religiöse Philosophie Wladimir Solowjews. Heidelberg Univ., Dissertation 1926.
 Alexander Koschewnikoff, Die Geschichtsphilosophie Wladimir Solowjews. Sonderabdruck. Bonn, Friedrich Cohen, 1930.
 Alexandre Kojève, Introduction to the Reading of Hegel: Lectures on the Phenomenology of Spirit, edited by Allan Bloom, Ithaca: Cornell University Press, 1980.
 Alexandre Kojève, "Interpretation of the General Introduction to Chapter VII [i.e., the Religion Chapter of Hegel's Phenomenology of Spirit]", translated by Ian Alexander Moore. In Parrhesia: A Journal of Critical Philosophy 20 (2014): 15–39, online .
 Alexandre Kojève, Outline of a Phenomenology of Right, Lanham: Rowman & Littlefield Publishers, 2000.
 Alexandre Kojève, "The Emperor Julian and His Art of Writing", in Joseph Cropsey, Ancients and Moderns; Essays on the Tradition of Political Philosophy in Honor of Leo Strauss, New York: Basic Books, p. 95-113, 1964.
 Alexandre Kojève, "Tyranny and Wisdom", in Leo Strauss, On Tyranny - Revised and Expanded Edition, Chicago: University of Chicago Press, p. 135-176, 2000.
 Alexandre Kojève, Esquisse d'une doctrine de la politique française (27.8.1945). Published in La règle du jeu 1 (1990). English translation by Erik De Vries: Outline of a Doctrine of French Policy. In Policy Review 2004, p. 3-40, online .
 Alexandre Kojève,  Düsseldorfer Vortrag: Kolonialismus in europäischer Sicht. In: Piet Tommissen (Hg.): Schmittiana. Beiträge zu Leben und Werk Carl Schmitts. Band 6, Berlin 1998, pp. 126–143. English translation and comment, incl. Schmitt-Kojève correspondence: Erik De Vries: Alexandre Kojève — Carl Schmitt Correspondence and Alexandre Kojève, "Colonialism from a European Perspective". In: Interpretation, 29/1 (2001), pp. 91–130.
 Alexandre Kojève, Essai d'une histoire raisonée de la philosophie païenne. Tome 1–3. Paris, 1968; 1997.
 Alexandre Kojève, Kant. Paris, 1973.
 Alexandre Kojève, Le concept, le temps et le discours. Paris, 1991. English translation by Robert B. Williamson: The Concept, Time and Discourse. St. Augustine's Press, South Bend IN, 2013.
 Alexandre Kojève, L'empereur Julien et son art d'écrire. Paris, 1997.
 Alexandre Kojève, Les peintures concrètes de Kandinsky. Paris, 2002 (1936).
 Alexandre Kojève, La notion d'autorité. Paris, 2004. English translation by Hager Weslati: The Notion of Authority. Verso, 2014.
 Alexandre Kojève and Auffret D., L'idée du determinisme dans la physique classique et dans la physique moderne. Paris, 1990.
 Alexandre Kojève and Bibard L., L'athéisme. Paris, 1998.
 Alexandre Kojève, Oltre la fenomenologia. Recensioni (1932-1937), Italian Translation by Giampiero Chivilò, «I volti», n. 68, Mimesis, Udine-Milano, 2012. .

See also
 Jean Wahl
 Post-Kojèvian discourse

References

Sources

Further reading
 Bibard, Laurent, la Sagesse et le Féminin, L'Harmattan, 2005
 
 
 
 Chivilò, Giampiero; Menon, Marco (eds.) (2015), Tirannide e filosofia: Con un saggio di Leo Strauss ed un inedito di Gaston Fessard sj, Venezia: Edizioni Ca' Foscari, pp. 335–416,

External links

 Introduction to the Reading of Hegel: lectures on the phenomenology of spirit English text]
 Internet Encyclopedia of Philosophy
 "The Discursivity of the Negative: Kojève on Language in Hegel" by Daniel J. Selcer
 "Biography of Alexandre Kojève" by Bryan-Paul Frost

1902 births
1968 deaths
20th-century atheists
20th-century essayists
20th-century French historians
20th-century French philosophers
Atheist philosophers
Continental philosophers
Critics of Marxism
European Union
French atheists
French essayists
French historians of philosophy
French male non-fiction writers
Emigrants from the Russian Empire to France
Hegel scholars
Hegelian philosophers
Historians of philosophy
Phenomenologists
Philosophers of culture
Philosophers of economics
Philosophers of history
Philosophers of mind
Philosophers of science
Philosophers of social science
Philosophy writers
Political philosophers
Social commentators
Social philosophers
Theorists on Western civilization
Writers about activism and social change